1996 in television may refer to:

1996 in American television
1996 in Australian television
1996 in Austrian television
1996 in Belgian television
1996 in Brazilian television
1996 in British television
1996 in Canadian television
1996 in Croatian television
1996 in Czech television
1996 in Danish television
1996 in Dutch television
1996 in Estonian television
1996 in French television
1996 in German television
1996 in Irish television
1996 in Israeli television
1996 in Japanese television
1996 in New Zealand television
1996 in Norwegian television
1996 in Philippine television
1996 in Portuguese television
1996 in Scottish television
1996 in South African television
1996 in Swedish television